Thomas Givon (also known as Talmy Givón) (born June 22, 1936) is a linguist and writer. He is one of the founders of "West Coast Functionalism", today classified as a usage-based model of language, and of the linguistics department at the University of Oregon. Givón advocates an evolutionary approach to language and communication.

Education 
Givón earned his bachelor of science degree cum laude in agriculture from the Hebrew University of Jerusalem in 1959. Attending UCLA, he received a Master of Science degree in horticulture in 1962, a C.Phil in Plant Biochemistry, a Master of Arts degree in linguistics in 1966, and a PhD in linguistics in 1969, as well as an TESL certificate in 1965.

Career
In 1966 Givón worked for System Development Corporation as a research associate in lexicography. The following year he went to University of Zambia where he researched Bantu languages. In 1969 he became an assistant professor of Linguistics and African Languages at University of California at Los Angeles. He was promoted to associate professor there in 1974 and full professor in 1979. In 1981 he moved to University of Oregon as professor of linguistics until 2002 when he became Distinguished Professor (emeritus) of Linguistics and Cognitive Science. Givón's last general linguistic project was The Genesis of Complex Syntax: Diachrony, Ontogeny, Cognition, Evolution.

Work in linguistics 
His work covers many language areas (Semitic, African, Amerindian, Austronesian, Papuan, Sino-Tibetan, Indo-European), as well as many areas of theoretical linguistics: (syntax, semantics, pragmatics, second language acquisition, pidgins and creoles, discourse and text linguistics, methodology and philosophy of science, philosophy of language, typology and language universals, grammaticalization and historical syntax, cognitive science, language evolution).

Givón is said to have coined the aphorism that "today's morphology is yesterday's syntax", in a development of Antoine Meillet's work on grammaticalisation.

He was the editor of the book series Typological Studies in Language published by John Benjamins Publishing Company.

Other writings
Givon has written a series of novels and historical translations through his publishing house, White Cloud Publishing, and is a google blogger.

Bibliography 
Givón's published books include:
The Travels of Benjamins Adam, (a novel; 1966)
The Si-Luyana Language: A Preliminary Linguistic Description, (1970)
Studies in Chi-Bemba and Bantu Grammar, (1973)
On Understanding Grammar, (1979) review in American Scientist vol 68, Sep–Oct 1980 
Ute Dictionary, (1979)
Ute Reference Grammar, (1980)
Topic Continuity in Discourse, (1983; editor)
Syntax: A Functional-Typological Introduction, (vol. I, 1984; vol. II 1990; revised edition published in 2001 as Syntax: An Introduction)
Ute Traditional Narratives, (1985)
Mind, Code, and Context: Essays in Pragmatics, (1989)
English Grammar, (2 vols; 1993)
Functionalism and Grammar, (1995) review in 
Running Through the Tall Grass, (a novel; 1997) review in Publishers Weekly
Syntax: An Introduction, (2 vols, 2001) review in 
The Genesis of Syntactic Complexity, (2009) review in 
Ute Reference Grammar, (2011)
"Seadock: The Boz Trilogy #1", (a novel; 2011)
"Sasquatch: The Boz Trilogy #2", (a novel; 2011)
"Blood: The Boz Trilogy #3", (a novel; 2012)
"Tao Teh Ching", (a historical translation; 2012)

References

External links
 Home page
 Blog page

Linguists from Israel
20th-century linguists
1936 births
University of Oregon faculty
University of California, Los Angeles alumni
Living people